Jitney may refer to:

Transportation
 Ford Model T, an influential car also colloquially known as a "jitney"
 Share taxi, a category of transportation falling between a taxicab and a bus
 Dollar van, a privately owned bus service
 Jitney cab, an informal, unlicensed or illegal taxicab operation

Other uses
 An archaic name for a nickel (United States coin)
 Jitney (play), written by August Wilson and premiered in 1982
 Forklift, also called a jitney
 Jitney Players, a traveling American acting company established in 1923.

See also
 Atlantic City Jitney Association, an association of operators of minibus service in Atlantic City, New Jersey, United States
 Hampton Jitney, an American bus company
 Jeepney, Philippine share taxi